is an anime television series adapted from the light novels of the same title by Takafumi Nanatsuki. The opening theme is "Ichizu Recipe" by Idol College, while the ending theme is "Twilight ni Kienaide" by Yumi Hara. The series follows the life of Kimito Kagurazaka, a high school student who has been kidnapped by an all girls elite school. He is brought there in order to teach the innocent girls there whom have no contact with the outside world the ways of a "commoner".

Episode list

References

External links
 (anime) 
Shomin Sample at Funimation

Lists of anime episodes
Lists of Japanese television series episodes